Cophomantella crypsizyga is a moth in the family Lecithoceridae. It was described by Edward Meyrick in 1914. It is known from Malawi.

The wingspan is about 16 mm. The forewings are dark bluish-purple fuscous with obscure transverse blackish fasciae at two-fifths and from two-thirds of the costa to the dorsum before the tornus, only visible in certain lights, the latter followed on the costa by a triangular whitish-ochreous spot. The hindwings are grey, darker towards the termen.

References

Moths described in 1914
Cophomantella
Taxa named by Edward Meyrick